A list of films produced in Japan ordered by year in the 1970s.  For an A–Z of films see :Category:Japanese films.

1970
Japanese films of 1970

1971
Japanese films of 1971

1972
Japanese films of 1972

1973
Japanese films of 1973

1974
Japanese films of 1974

1975
Japanese films of 1975

1976
Japanese films of 1976

1977
Japanese films of 1977

1978
Japanese films of 1978

1979
Japanese films of 1979

External links
 Japanese film at the Internet Movie Database

1970s
Japanese
Films